The following is a list of television series that are currently or have been previously broadcast by the American pay television channel Cinemax.

Although the large majority of Cinemax's programming consists of feature films, the network has produced and broadcast, either in first-run form or as secondary runs, a limited number of television series over the course of the network's existence.

In February 2011, it was announced that Cinemax would begin to offer mainstream original programming to compete with sister channel HBO, and rivals Showtime and Starz; the channel is slated to develop action-oriented original mainstream series aimed at males ages 18–49. The decision is also in part due to competition from other on-demand movie services such as Netflix and iTunes, and to change Cinemax's image from a channel mostly known for its former Max After Dark programming. With the launch of the HBO Max streaming service in 2020, Cinemax's non-adult library of programming shifted to that service throughout 2021, and original programming for the network has all but been depreciated under the ownership of AT&T, then Warner Bros. Discovery, with the desktop "Cinemax Go" service ending on July 31, 2022.

Original programming

Drama

Animation

Adult animation

Co-productions
These shows have been commissioned by Cinemax in cooperation with a partner from another country.

Classic programming

Sketch comedy

Max After Dark

References

Cinemax